NSV or nSv may refer to:

Nationalist organisations
 National Socialist Vanguard, a US neo-Nazi group
 Nationalistische Studentenvereniging, the Flemish Nationalist Student Association
 Nationalsozialistische Volkswohlfahrt, the Nazi People's Welfare Organization
 National-Social Association, a political party of the former German empire, initials NSV

Science and technology
 Nullsoft Streaming Video format
 New Catalogue of Suspected Variable Stars
 Nanosievert, a unit of radiation
 Newton–Størmer–Verlet method in mathematics
 No scalpel vasectomy

Other
 Nürnberger-Spielkarten-Verlag, German game and playing card manufacturer
 NSV machine gun, Soviet, 12.7 mm
 Neighbourhoods for a Sustainable Vancouver, British Columbia, Canada